The uvular ejective is a type of consonantal sound, used in some spoken languages.

Features
Features of the uvular ejective:

Occurrence
One ejective
A single plain uvular ejective is found in almost all Northeast Caucasian languages, all South Caucasian languages, and some Athabaskan languages, as well as Itelmen, Quechua and Aymara.
Itelmen, where it is written ӄ': ӄ'ил'хч  to depart.
Georgian, where it is written ყ: ტყავი  skin, pelt. Unlike its velar counterpart, it does not contrast with voiced or voiceless uvular stops; the voiceless uvular stop of Old Georgian has merged with the voiceless velar fricative in modern Georgian. Some scholars view this Georgian phoneme as being rather an uvular ejective fricative .
Tahltan:  door.

Two ejectives
Most Salishan languages, the Tlingit language, and Adyghe and Kabardian (Northwest Caucasian) demonstrate a two-way contrast between labialised and plain uvular ejectives.
Klallam: wəq̕ə́q̕  frog, sq̕ʷúŋi(ʔ)  head.
North Straits Salish, where the two are written K and K̴ in the Saanich orthography: Saanich KEYOṮEN  slug, snail, SK̴EḰĆES  red huckleberry.
The Akhvakh language appears to have a contrast between lax and tense uvular ejectives:  soup, broth (lax) vs.  cock's comb (tense).

Three ejectives
Abkhaz contrasts plain, palatalised and labialised uvular ejectives, written ҟ ҟь ҟə: аҟаҧшь  red, -ҵəҟьа  really, indeed (a verbal suffix), Аҟәа  Sukhum. As with Georgian, Abkhaz has no non-ejective uvular stops; the historically present uvular aspirates have merged with their corresponding fricatives, although the aspirates are preserved in Abaza.

Five ejectives
The plain uvular ejective is one of the most common consonants in Ubykh, due to its presence in the past tense suffix . But in addition to palatalised, labialised and plain uvular ejectives, Ubykh also possesses a pharyngealised version and a concurrently labialised and pharyngealised version, making a total of five:  he said it,  small and round,  to seize,  to chew,  cavern.

See also
 List of phonetics topics

References

External links
 

Uvular consonants
Ejectives
Oral consonants
Central consonants